Vydrino is a rural locality (a settlement) in Kabansky District, Republic of Buryatia, Russia. The population was 796 as of 2010. There are 8 streets.

Geography 
Vydrino was established in 1902. It is located 149 km southwest of Kabansk (the district's administrative centre) by road. Kedrovaya is the nearest rural locality.
In  Prison colony close to Vydrino in 1974 died famous Buddhist teacher and scholar  Bidia Dandaron.

References 

Rural localities in Kabansky District
Populated places on Lake Baikal